George Hires (January 26, 1835 – February 16, 1911) was an American Republican Party businessman and politician who represented New Jersey's 1st congressional district in the United States House of Representatives for two terms from 1885 to 1889.

Early life and education
Hires was born in Elsinboro Township, New Jersey on January 26, 1835. He attended the common schools and the Friends' School and received commercial training. He engaged in mercantile and manufacturing pursuits.

Political career
He was sheriff of Salem County from 1867 to 1869, and was a member of the New Jersey Senate from 1881 to 1884.

Congress
Hires was elected as a Republican to the Forty-ninth and Fiftieth Congresses, serving in office from March 4, 1885 – March 3, 1889, but was not a candidate for renomination in 1888 to the 51st Congress.

Later career
After leaving Congress, he resumed mercantile pursuits, and also engaged in banking. He was a delegate to the State constitutional convention in 1894 and a delegate to the 1896 Republican National Convention. He was a member of the Republican State committee for twelve years.

Hires died in Atlantic City, New Jersey on February 16, 1911, and was interred in the First Presbyterian Cemetery in Salem, New Jersey.

External links

George Hires at The Political Graveyard

1835 births
1911 deaths
People from Elsinboro Township, New Jersey
Politicians from Salem County, New Jersey
Republican Party New Jersey state senators
New Jersey sheriffs
Republican Party members of the United States House of Representatives from New Jersey
19th-century American politicians